The Jeff Ruby Steaks (a homophone of the word Stakes, for commercial reasons) is a Grade III American thoroughbred horse race at a distance of a one and one-eighth miles on the synthetic track in late March at Turfway Park in Florence, Kentucky. The event currently offers a purse of $600,000.

History 
The event was inaugurated on 1 April 1972 as the Latonia Spiral Stakes over a distance of one mile, established by the General Manager of the Latonia race track John Battaglia for horses "spiraling up" to the Kentucky Derby.

The race in its infancy attracted many entries and the administration of the track decided to run the event in two divisions in the following years: 1973, 1974, 1975, 1977, 1978, and 1980.

In 1982, bourbon whiskey maker Jim Beam acquired naming rights sponsorship and the race was renamed the Jim Beam Spiral Stakes. That year the distance of event was increased to  miles.  Two years later the event was named the Jim Beam Stakes. The sponsorship deal lasted for 17 years and during that time the event attracted many of the prominent three year olds. 

In 1984, the event was upgraded to Grade III status, then, following the sale of the track to Jerry Carroll that led to the track's renaming to Turfway Park in 1986, featured a substantial purse increase in 1988, was upgraded to a Grade II race.

In 1988, the distance of the event was increased to  miles. The horse breeding facility Lane's End Farm took over sponsorship of the event in 2003 for eight years.

The event was downgraded back to Grade III status in 2011. 

In 2013, the event was sponsored by the Horseshoe Casino in Cincinnati. Currently, the Spiral Stakes is sponsored by Jeff Ruby Culinary Entertainment, owner of Jeff Ruby's Steakhouses. As part of the sponsorship, the race is referred to as the Jeff Ruby Steaks (similar to other sporting events named for a product).

On 30 March 1991, Hansel set a new track record while winning the Jim Beam Stakes. In 1995, future Hall of Famer Serena's Song became the first and only filly to win the race. Other horses to win who went on to capture at least one of the American Classic Races includes Summer Squall (1990), Lil E. Tee (1992), Prairie Bayou (1993), and Animal Kingdom (2011).

In 2021, as part of the Turfway Park renovation, the race was moved from the old Polytrack surface to the newly installed Tapeta surface, the race was also included as a high profile Championship series event on the Road to the Kentucky Derby.

Records
Speed record
 miles – 1:46.60  Hansel (1991)  
 miles  – 1:42.00 Banner Bob (1985)
 1 mile –  	1:36.60 Major Run (1980)

Margins
 15 lengths – Bootlegger's Pet (1973)
 13 lengths – Five Star General (1980)
 lengths  – Balto Star (2001)

Most wins by an owner
 4 –  Golden Chance Farm  (1977, 1978, 1980 (2))

Most wins by a jockey
 5 – Pat Day (1984, 1987, 1989, 1990, 1992)

Most wins by a trainer
 7 – William E. Adams (1977 (2), 1978 (2), 1979, 1980 (2))

Winners

Legend:

 
 

Notes:

ƒ Filly

See also
 Road to the Kentucky Derby
 List of American and Canadian Graded races

External sites
Turfway Park Media Guide 2018–19

References

Turfway Park horse races
Flat horse races for three-year-olds
Triple Crown Prep Races
Graded stakes races in the United States
Grade 3 stakes races in the United States
Recurring sporting events established in 1972
1972 establishments in Kentucky
Horse racing in Kentucky
Horse races in Kentucky